Bryan Burke (born January 3, 1989) is an American soccer player who last played professionally for San Francisco Deltas in the North American Soccer League.

Youth
Burke was born and raised in Newport Beach, California and played at the collegiate level for the University of San Francisco Dons from 2007 to 2010.

Professional
After college, he played in the USL Premier Development League for the Kitsap Pumas in 2011, winning the most valuable player award and earning an appearance in the PDL Championship in his first season. After playing for the Orange County Blues in 2012, he went on trial with Sporting Kansas City and the San Jose Earthquakes before signing with Orlando City.
 
Burke made 15 match appearances in 2013, tallying two goals and four assists. On July 5, 2013 he sustained a season-ending injury against the Charleston Battery. Burke re-signed with Orlando City in 2014 but was released in September, a casualty of the club's transition to Major League Soccer.

In February 2015 Burke signed with expansion side Louisville City FC of United Soccer League. At season's end he was named the USL Defender of the Year.

Burke signed with North American Soccer League club Jacksonville Armada FC in December 2015.

In 2018, Burke featured for the Oakland Leopards, an amateur affiliate of Oakland Roots SC.

Honors

Individual

USL Assists Champion: 2015
USL All League First Team: 2015
USL Defender of the Year: 2015

References

External links
 Official Website
 University of San Francisco bio

1989 births
Living people
American soccer players
San Francisco Dons men's soccer players
Orange County Blue Star players
Kitsap Pumas players
Orange County SC players
Orlando City SC (2010–2014) players
Louisville City FC players
Jacksonville Armada FC players
San Francisco Deltas players
Soccer players from California
USL League Two players
USL Championship players
North American Soccer League players
Association football defenders